QJ may refer to:
 QJ, a UHF band radio frequency
 QJ (New York City Subway service), a defunct New York City Subway service, now superseded by the J/Z services
 ATCvet code QJ Antiinfectives for systemic use, a section of the Anatomical Therapeutic Chemical Classification System for veterinary medicinal products
 China Railways QJ, a Chinese 2-10-2 steam locomotive
 Quarterly Journal of Austrian Economics
 Quarterly Journal of Economics